The Chairman of the Supreme Soviet of the Kazakh Soviet Socialist Republic (from December 10, 1991: Republic of Kazakhstan) was the presiding officer of that legislature.

References

Sources

Political history of Kazakhstan
Lists of legislative speakers in the Soviet Union
Politics of the Soviet Union
List
List